Alen may refer to:

People
 Alen (given name), a Bosniak, Serbian and Croatian given name
 Alén (name), surname and given name
 Alen baronets of Ireland

Fictional characters
 Alen (Suikoden), a fictional character from Suikoden

Places
 Monte Alén National Park, Equatorial Guinea
 Ålen Church, Holtålen, Trøndelag, Norway; a parish church in the Church of Norway
 Ålen Station, Renbygda, Holtålen, Trøndelag, Norway; a train station

Other uses
 Alen (unit of length), or Aln, a traditional Scandinavian unit of distance
 Alén Space, Spanish NewSpace company
 Industrias AlEn, Mexican chemical company

See also

 Van Alen (disambiguation)
 
 Alan (disambiguation)
 Allan (disambiguation)
 Allen (disambiguation)